The Missal of Silos is the oldest known document on paper (as opposed to parchment) created in Europe; it dates to before 1080 AD. The manuscript was written on quarto; it comprises 157 folios, of which folios 1 to 37 are on paper and the rest are on parchment. Strictly speaking, it is not a missal: It has been described as a breviary-missal. It can also be described as a Liber Mysticus or Breviarum gothicum. 

The missal is "Codex 6" held in the library of the Monastery of Santo Domingo de Silos near Burgos, Spain. It is one of a number of liturgical manuscripts of the Mozarabic rite which have been preserved in the Silos library, despite the suppression of the rite in 1080 by Pope Gregory VII. The codex is named after its current location in Silos, but it was not made at the Silos monastery's scriptorium; it was made at the monastery of Santa María la Real of Nájera. The paper for the missal is believed to have been manufactured in Al-Andalus, even though Nájera was in Christian territory at the time the document was created.

In 2013, the manuscript was inspected by Umberto Eco, who had referred to Silos in his 1980 novel The Name of the Rose. Eco's visit was widely reported in the Spanish press.

References

External links
 
 

Missals
11th-century manuscripts
Mozarabic art and architecture
Paper
Province of Burgos
Spanish manuscripts